Phacelia minor, with the common names Whitlavia and  wild Canterbury bells, is a species of phacelia. It is native to Southern California and Baja California, where it grows in the Colorado Desert and the coastal and inland mountains of the Transverse-Peninsular Ranges, often in chaparral and areas recently burned.

Description
Phacelia minor is an annual herb producing a mostly unbranched erect stem 20 to 60 centimeters tall. It is glandular and coated in stiff hairs. The leaves are up to 11 centimeters long with toothed, crinkly, oval or rounded blades borne on long petioles. The showy inflorescence is a one-sided curving or coiling cyme of many bell-shaped flowers, each up to 4 centimeters in length. The large flowers are lavender to deep blue-purple in color with protruding stamens tipped with white anthers.

There are reports that glandular hairs of stems, flowers and leaves of P. minor secrete oil droplets that can cause an unpleasant skin rash (contact dermatitis) in some people.

See also
California chaparral and woodlands ecoregion
California coastal sage and chaparral ecoregion
Colorado Desert

References

Further reading

External links
Jepson Manual Treatment - Phacelia minor
Phacelia minor - Photo gallery

minor
Flora of California
Flora of Baja California
Flora of the California desert regions
Flora of the Sonoran Deserts
Natural history of the Colorado Desert
Natural history of the California chaparral and woodlands
Natural history of the Peninsular Ranges
Natural history of the Santa Monica Mountains
Natural history of the Transverse Ranges
Garden plants of North America
Drought-tolerant plants
Plants described in 1846
Flora without expected TNC conservation status